Barad  is a mountainous village in northern Syria, administratively part of the Aleppo Governorate, located northwest of Aleppo. Nearby localities include Burj Abdullah to the northwest, Kimar to the north, Aqiba to the northeast and Nubl to the east. On March 21, 2018, the village came under the control of the Syrian National Army.

Population
According to the Syria Central Bureau of Statistics (CBS), Barad had a population of 1,229 in the 2004 census. Although the vicinity of Barad is still populated, it is listed as one of the Dead Cities, a UNESCO World Heritage Site. It is the most extensive ancient site in the area with an important group of buildings dating from the Byzantine era.

Archaeological remains 
The archaeological remains in the vicinity of Barad include several old churches, an ancient monastery, a large public bathhouse, five warehouses, meeting house, a magistrate's residence, a tetrapylon, two monasteries and a cathedral. Most of these date from the Byzantine period.

The cathedral, known as the Church of Julianos, was built between 399 and 402 CE. It is a large building containing a sizable bema ("elevated position") in the center of the hall which represents the centrality of Jerusalem. At the end of its wall is a book rest. Of the seven churches that were built in northern Syria before 400 CE, the Church of Julianos was one of two large three-aisled basilicas; the other five were smaller, with only a single aisle.

A second church was built in Barad in the 6th century.

In February 2010, Lebanese Maronite Christian Michel Aoun led a delegation to visit Barad, in order to commemorate the 1600th anniversary of St. Maron's death.

On 22 March 2018, Barad was bombed by Turkish forces during the Operation Olive Branch. Several important structures were damaged or destroyed, including the tomb of St. Maron, and the Julianos Church.

References

Bibliography 

Populated places in Afrin District
Villages in Aleppo Governorate
Dead Cities